Samson Hassan Laizer (born 30 December 1949) is a Tanzanian boxer. He competed in the men's light heavyweight event at the 1972 Summer Olympics.

References

External links
 

1949 births
Living people
Tanzanian male boxers
Olympic boxers of Tanzania
Boxers at the 1972 Summer Olympics
Place of birth missing (living people)
Light-heavyweight boxers